Angus Daniel McDonald (April 14, 1878 – November 15, 1941) was an American railroad executive. He was president of the Southern Pacific Company, the parent company of the Southern Pacific Railroad.

McDonald attended the University of Notre Dame, where he was the first baseman and team captain for the baseball team, and both the quarterback and placekicker for the football team in 1899.  McDonald was the first kicker at the university to use a holder (a technique known then as the "Princeton Kick") rather than the drop kick.

In 1931, McDonald was named a Knight of Malta by Pope Pius XI.

References
 
 

20th-century American railroad executives
Southern Pacific Railroad people
American football quarterbacks
Notre Dame Fighting Irish football players
1878 births
1941 deaths